Leah Hunt-Hendrix is an American political activist. Hunt-Hendrix is currently a senior advisor at the American Economic Liberties Project. She was involved in the Occupy Wall Street movement.

Early life and education 
Hunt-Hendrix was born and raised in New York City. She is the daughter of Helen LaKelly Hunt and Harville Hendrix. Her sister, Hunter Hunt-Hendrix, is the founder of American metal band Liturgy. She is also the granddaughter of Texas oil tycoon H.L. Hunt and niece of Kansas City Chiefs founder Lamar Hunt. 

In 2005, Hunt-Hendrix received a bachelor's degree in political science and governance from Duke University. In 2013, she completed a doctorate in religion, ethics and politics at Princeton University, where she wrote on the concept of solidarity. Jeffrey Stout, Eric Gregory, and Cornel West were her Ph.D. advisors.

Activism and journalism 
She was a participant in the Occupy Wall Street movement. She founded three activist organizations: Solidaire, Way to Win, and the Emergent Fund. Solidaire was founded in 2013 to support racial and economic justice. Way to Win was founded after Donald Trump's election in 2016 to give money to grassroots progressive organizations in swing states.

Hunt-Hendrix has written articles for The Nation magazine in addition to The New Republic and Politico. In an opinion piece in 2022, Hunt-Hendrix argued that the Democratic Party should embrace an inclusive form of populism and advocate for policies that benefit working-class people.

Personal life 
She has lived in New York, Egypt, Syria, the West Bank, and San Francisco. She now resides in Washington, D.C.

See also 
 Democracy Alliance
 Institute for Policy Studies
 New Economy Coalition

References

Living people
Occupy movement
American political activists
People from New York City
Princeton University alumni
Activists from New York (state)
People from San Francisco
Year of birth missing (living people)
Hunt family
Duke University alumni